Hemel Hempstead is a constituency in Hertfordshire represented in the House of Commons of the Parliament of the United Kingdom. It elects one Member of Parliament (MP) by the first-past-the-post system. Since 2005, it has been represented by Mike Penning, a member of the Conservative Party.

Constituency profile
The seat covers the new town of Hemel Hempstead which is a significant employment centre, as well as a rural area of the Chilterns to the north. Residents are slightly wealthier than the UK average.

History 
The constituency was established as a Division of Hertfordshire by the Representation of the People Act 1918, largely created from the northern half of the Watford Division, including Hemel Hempstead, Berkhamsted and Tring.  It also included north-western part of the St Albans Division, around Harpenden.

Harpenden was transferred back to St Albans in 1974 and the constituency was temporarily abolished from 1983 to 1997 during which time it was replaced by West Hertfordshire.

Boundaries and boundary changes 

1918–1950: The Municipal Borough of Hemel Hempstead, the Urban Districts of Berkhamsted, Harpenden, and Tring, the Rural Districts of Berkhamsted and Hemel Hempstead, in the Rural District of St Albans the parishes of Harpenden Rural, Redbourn, and Wheathampstead, and in the Rural District of Watford the parishes of Abbots Langley and Sarratt.

1950–1974: The Municipal Borough of Hemel Hempstead, the Urban Districts of Berkhamsted, Harpenden, and Tring, the Rural Districts of Berkhamsted and Hemel Hempstead, and in the Rural District of St Albans the parishes of Harpenden Rural and Redbourn.

Parish of Wheathampstead transferred back to St Albans.  Parishes of Abbots Langley and Sarratt included in the new County Constituency of South West Hertfordshire.

1974–1983: The Municipal Borough of Hemel Hempstead, the Urban Districts of Berkhamsted and Tring, and the Rural Districts of Berkhamsted and Hemel Hempstead.

The Urban District of Harpenden and the part of the Rural District of St Albans (parishes of Harpenden Rural and Redbourn) now transferred back to St Albans.

The constituency was abolished for the 1983 general election. Berkhamsted and the area to the south of Hemel Hempstead, including Kings Langley, was transferred to South West Hertfordshire.  The remainder, including Hemel Hempstead and Tring, formed the new County Constituency of West Hertfordshire.

1997–2010: The District of Dacorum wards of Adeyfield East, Adeyfield West, Ashridge, Bennetts End, Boxmoor, Central, Chaulden, Crabtree, Cupid Green, Flamstead and Markyate, Gadebridge, Grove Hill, Highfield, Kings Langley, Leverstock Green, Nash Mills, South, and Warners End.

Re-established for the 1997 general election from the bulk of the abolished County Constituency of West Hertfordshire (excluding Tring).  Kings Langley transferred back from South West Hertfordshire.

2010–present: The District of Dacorum wards of Adeyfield East, Adeyfield West, Apsley, Ashridge, Bennetts End, Boxmoor, Chaulden and Shrubhill, Corner Hall, Gadebridge, Grove Hill, Hemel Hempstead Central, Highfield and St Paul's, Kings Langley, Leverstock Green, Nash Mills, Warners End, Watling, and Woodhall.

Minor loss to South West Hertfordshire following revision of local authority wards.

Members of Parliament

MPs, 1918–1983

MPs, 1997–present

Elections

Elections in the 2010s

 

This was the highest swing from Labour to Conservative in the 2010 general election.

Elections in the 2000s

Elections in the 1990s

Elections in the 1970s

Elections in the 1960s

Elections in the 1950s

Elections in the 1940s 

General Election 1939–40:
Another general election was required to take place before the end of 1940. The political parties had been making preparations for an election to take place from 1939 and by the end of this year, the following candidates had been selected; 
Conservative: Frances Davidson
Liberal: Ian Davidson
Labour: A W Harper

Elections in the 1930s

Elections in the 1920s

Elections in the 1910s

See also 
 List of parliamentary constituencies in Hertfordshire

References
Specific

General
Craig, F. W. S. (1983). British parliamentary election results 1918-1949 (3 ed.). Chichester: Parliamentary Research Services. .

Sources
 

Parliamentary constituencies in Hertfordshire
Constituencies of the Parliament of the United Kingdom established in 1918
Constituencies of the Parliament of the United Kingdom disestablished in 1983
Constituencies of the Parliament of the United Kingdom established in 1997
Politics of Dacorum